Palpita quadristigmalis, the four-spotted palpita moth, is a moth in the family Crambidae. It is found in North America, where it has been recorded from Quebec and Ontario to Florida, west to Arizona and north to Colorado.

The length of the forewings is 13.5-14.5 mm. The forewings are translucent white with a dark brown strip along the costa containing three black dots in the basal half. The hindwings are white with a dark discal dot. Adults are on wing in May and June in the north and nearly year-round in the southern part of the range.

The larvae feed on Ligustrum species.

The larvae have also been found feeding on Olea europaea (olive) in Texas. They are recognized as a potential pest, as they are able to defoliate entire orchards and will also feed on the olive fruit.

References

Palpita
Moths described in 1854
Moths of North America
Taxa named by Achille Guenée